The New York Mutuals baseball team (1857–1876) joined the National Association for the league's debut season in 1871. The Mutuals went 16-17 and finished in fifth place. Pitcher Rynie Wolters led the NA in runs batted in, with 44.

Regular season
The 1871 regular playing season stats:

Season standings

Record vs. opponents

Roster

Player stats

Starters by position

Note: Pos = Position; G = Games played; AB = At bats; H = Hits; Avg. = Batting average; HR = Home runs; RBI = Runs batted in

Other batters

Note: G = Games played; AB = At bats; H = Hits; Avg. = Batting average; HR = Home runs; RBI = Runs batted in

Starting pitchers
Note: G = Games pitched; IP = Innings pitched; W = Wins; L = Losses; ERA = Earned run average; SO = Strikeouts

Relief pitchers
Note: G = Games pitched; IP = Innings pitched; W = Wins; L = Losses; ERA = Earned run average; SO = Strikeouts

References

External links 
 1871 Mutuals at Baseball Reference

New York Mutuals seasons
New York Mutuals season
New York Mutuals
19th century in Brooklyn
Williamsburg, Brooklyn